Zuhur (Zhour, Zhor, or Zohoor)  is a feminine given name in Arabic, meaning "flowers" in Arabic.

People
 Zuhur Dixon
 Zhor El Kamch
 Zohoor Alaa
 
 Zuhur Wanasi

References

Arabic feminine given names